{{Infobox surname
| name            = 鄧/邓
| image           = 
| image_size      = 
| caption         = 
| romanization    = Teng ( Wade-Giles  Cantonese: Dahng (Yale), Dang6 (Jyutping) Minnan/Taiwanese: Tēng ( Pe̍h-ōe-jī)  Vietnamese: Đặng    Korean: Deung )
| pronunciation   = Dèng
| gender          = 
| feminine        = 
| masculine       = 
| language        = 
| languageorigin  = 
| origin          = Nanyang, Henan ancestral hall
| derivation      = 
| meaning         = 
| variant         = 
| cognate         = 
| anglicisation   = 
| derivative      = 
| seealso         = 
| family          = 
}}
Deng is an East Asian surname of Chinese origin which has many variant spellings and transliterations. It is a transcription of 邓 (simplified Chinese character) or 鄧 (traditional). In 2019 Deng was 21st most common surname in Mainland China.

Variant spellings
It is transliterated as Dèng in pinyin and Teng, or Then, in Wade-Giles. In Cantonese, it is Dahng in Yale and Dang6 in Jyutping.  In Minnan or Taiwanese, it is Tēng in Pe̍h-ōe-jī. The surname originating from the same Chinese character or more specifically, Han character in Vietnamese is Đặng and it is one of the top ten surnames in Vietnam. The name is transliterated as Deung in Korean but is very rare in Korea. Deng is one of the surnames of the Nanyang, Henan ancestral hall.
In addition to spelling "Deng" used in mainland China, other common Chinese spelling variations include:
 Tang - Romanization based on Cantonese spelling common in Hong Kong and Macao
 Teng - Romanization based on Wade-Giles transliteration of Mandarin Chinese common spelling in Taiwan
 Ong or Ang - based on the Taishanese pronunciation, as in the case of Betty Ong

Notable people with the surname

 Deng Ai, general of Cao Wei during the Three Kingdoms period
 Deng Chao, contemporary Chinese actor
 Deng Zhi, general of Shu Han during the Three Kingdoms period
 Kent Deng, economic historian and writer
 Deng Longguang, Chinese general in World War II 
 Deng Ming-Dao, Taoist author
 Deng Shichang, Qing Dynasty admiral
 Deng Shiru, calligrapher and seal carver
 Deng Xiaoping, former leader of China
 Deng Pufang, son of Deng Xiaoping
 Deng Nan, daughter of Deng Xiaoping
 Deng Zhuodi, grandson of Deng Xiaoping
 Deng Jiaxian, nuclear physicist and recipient of the Two Bombs, One Satellite Meritorious Award
 Deng Qingming, People's Liberation Army Astronaut Corps taikonaut who flew on Shenzhou 15
 Deng Yingchao, wife of Zhou Enlai
 Deng Liqun, leading figure of the Chinese Communist Party in the 1980s
 Deng Yanda, 1895-1931, left-wing general who tried to create a middle ground between the Chinese Communists and Chiang Kai-shek
 Deng Yaping, table tennis player
 Deng Yujiao, Chinese woman involved in the Deng Yujiao incident
 Deng Zhonghan, Chinese electrical engineer and CEO of Vimicro
 Alan Kwong-wing Tang, actor and movie producer
 Tang Wing Cheung, birth name of Cantonese opera and film actor Sun Ma Sze Tsang
 Chris Tang (鄧炳強), commissioner of Hong Kong police 
 H. T. Teng, Taiwanese ichthyologist
 Teresa Teng, Taiwanese singer
 Si-an Deng, Chinese-Canadian badminton player
 Wendi Deng, (birth name Dèng Wéngé or Dèng Wén Gé'' (邓文革)) Chinese-American businesswoman, former wife of Rupert Murdoch
 Deng Maoqi, leader of a tenant rebellion in Fujian at the end of the 1440s
 Lydia Dunn, Baroness Dunn, crossbench British Peer
 Patrick Dunn,, Hong Kong TV personality
 Sheren Tang, Hong Kong TVB actress
 Lee C. Teng, Chinese/Taiwanese scientist
 G.E.M., HK Cantopop Singer-Songwriter
 Kanny Theng, Singaporean actress
 Stephy Tang (born 1983), Hong Kong Cantopop singer and actress
 Teng Chia-chi, Deputy Mayor of Taipei
 Tang Tuck Kan, Malaysia contemporary artist

Notable people with surname "Tang" 

 Tang Tsz-kei, better known as G.E.M. (born 1991), Hong Kong singer
 Stephy Tang (born 1983), Hong Kong Cantopop singer and actress
 Sheren Tang Shui-man (born 2 March 1966), Hong Kong actress
 Chris Tang Ping-keung, PDSM (Chinese: 鄧炳強, born 4 July 1965), Commissioner of Police of the Hong Kong Police Force since 19 November 2019
 Alan Tang Kwong-Wing (20 September 1946 – 29 March 2011), Hong Kong film actor, producer and director
 Patrick Tang, Hong Kong singer, actor, and TV show host
 Shermon Tang Sheung Man (Chinese: 鄧上文), Hong Kong television actress
 Natasha Tang (born Tang Wing Yung, Chinese: 鄧穎欣; Jyutping: dang6 wing6 jan1; 23 August 1992), Hong Kong distance swimmer
 Billy Tang Hin-Shing (Chinese: 鄧衍成), Hong Kong film director
 Robert Tang Kwok-ching, GBM, SBS, JP (Chinese: 鄧國楨; born 7 January 1947), retired Hong Kong judge
 Tang So Ha (邓淑霞), survivor of the Andrew Road triple murders case in 1983

References

External links
 https://www.oocities.org/thienwp/storyofdeng.htm

Chinese-language surnames
Individual Chinese surnames